V15 may refer to :

 Laffly V15, a French light 4WD artillery tractor used during World War II.
 A 1958 Shure phono cartridge.
 Vanguard 15, a popular one design racing dinghy.
 Bell XV-15, an American experimental tiltrotor aircraft.

See also

 Vega flight VV15 (11 July 2019)
 
 
 
 W15 (disambiguation)
 U15 (disambiguation)
 15 (disambiguation)
 V (disambiguation)